Rest or REST may refer to:

Relief from activity
 Sleep
 Bed rest
 Kneeling
 Lying (position)
 Sitting
 Squatting position

Structural support
 Structural support
 Rest (cue sports) 
 Armrest
 Headrest
 Footrest

Arts and entertainment

Music
 Rest (music), a pause in a piece of music
 Rest (band), Irish instrumental doom metal band
 Rest (Gregor Samsa album), 2008
 Rest (Charlotte Gainsbourg album), 2017
 "Rest", a 1990 song by Green Day from 39/Smooth
 "Rest", a 2014 song by Kutless from Glory
 "Rest", a 2015 song by Matt Maher from Saints and Sinners
 "Rest", a 2012 song by Michael Kiwanuka from Home Again
 "Rest", a 2000 song by Skillet from Invincible
 "Rest", a 2009 song by The Temper Trap from Conditions
 "Rest", tune name for a setting of "Dear Lord and Father of Mankind"

Painting
 Repose (painting), by Manet, c.1871
 Le Repos (Picasso), 1932
 Rest (Bouguereau), 1879

Businesses and organisations
 Relief Society of Tigray, an NGO in Ethiopia
 Retail Employees Superannuation Trust, an Australian industry superannuation fund

Places
 Rest, Kansas, U.S.
 Rest, Virginia, U.S.

Science and technology
 Representational state transfer (REST), a software architecture 
 Restricted Environmental Stimulation Technique, a sensory deprivation technique
 reStructuredText (ReST or reST), a file format for textual data 
 REST (gene) or RE1-silencing transcription factor, a human gene

Other uses
 Rest (finance), a financial terminology
 Rest (physics), related to inertia
 Revised Extended Standard Theory, a theory of linguistic competence developed by Noam Chomsky
 James Rest (died 1999), American psychologist

See also
 
 
 Restaurant (disambiguation)
 Rest stop (disambiguation)
 Death
 Leisure
 Relaxation technique